Anastasia Soare (née Bălămaci, born 28 December 1956) is a Romanian-American businesswoman, and the CEO and founder of Anastasia Beverly Hills, known as the "Eyebrow Queen". As of 2022, Forbes estimated her net worth at $660 million.

Early life
Soare was born in Constanța, Romania. She is the child of Dumitru Bălămaci (who died when she was 12) and Victoria Babu, who owned a tailoring shop. She studied art history and architecture in Romania.

Career
In Los Angeles, as she spoke very little English, Soare worked as an aesthetician at a beauty salon and soon realized that eyebrows were an under-explored area. "I developed a technique for how to shape eyebrows according to people's bone structure and natural eyebrow shape". As her manager did not think there was enough of a market, she rented a room in a Beverly Hills salon, providing facials, body waxing, and eyebrow sculpting. By 1997, she was running her own salon on Beverly Hills' Bedford Drive. As a beautician, she has stated that her first two clients for an eyebrow treatment were Cindy Crawford and Naomi Campbell. Other clients have included Faye Dunaway and Jennifer Lopez.

Soare is the CEO and founder of Anastasia Beverly Hills beauty brand, available in almost 2,000 stores internationally. In 2016, Soare stated that she owned 100% of the company.

As of January 2019, Anastasia Beverly Hills had the most popular Instagram page in the beauty industry, with 20.6 million followers.

In June 2022, Forbes estimated Soare's net worth at $660 million.

Personal life
In 1978, she married Victor Soare, a ship's captain. The couple has a daughter, Claudia, who is also active in the makeup business.

In 1986, while his ship was docked in Italy, Victor Soare visited the American embassy and asked for asylum. He reached the United States six months later. However, Soare and her daughter were not allowed to leave Romania to join him in the United States until 1989. Victor and Anastasia divorced in 1994.

She lives in Beverly Hills, California, US.

References

External links 
Official website

1950s births
Living people
20th-century American businesspeople
20th-century American businesswomen
20th-century Romanian businesspeople
21st-century American businesspeople
21st-century American businesswomen
American billionaires
American company founders
American women company founders
Female billionaires
People from Constanța
Romanian billionaires
Romanian company founders
Romanian emigrants to the United States
Year of birth missing (living people)
Former billionaires